Darren Barker (born 19 May 1982) is a British former professional boxer who competed from 2004 to 2013. He held multiple titles at middleweight, including the IBF title in 2013; the Commonwealth title from 2007 to 2009; the British title in 2009; and the European title from 2010 to 2011. As an amateur, Barker represented England at the 2002 Commonwealth Games and won a gold medal in the light-welterweight division.

Amateur career
Barker started his boxing career at a young age, he trained at Finchley and District Amateur Boxing club in New Barnet where he was trained by Jimmy Oliver (father of former European Champion Spencer Oliver) amongst others.  After a successful and long period at the club, Barker decided to move on to further his boxing skills and begun training at the Repton Boys Club in Bethnal Green, there he was trained by the highly regarded boxing coach, Tony Burns. Darren's father, Terry, was also a successful amateur boxer at Repton, winning the ABA Championships in 1981.  In 2002 Barker won the Commonwealth Games Gold medal at the championships held in Manchester. He also became a Multi nations Champion and Class C NABC Champion.  Prior to the decision to turn professional Barker's amateur record stood at 68 fights, 55 wins and 13 losses.

Professional career
Barker's first outing as a professional took place on 24 September 2004 with a fight at the Ice Arena in Nottingham defeating journeyman Howard Clarke.  He next fought on 12 November 2004 at the Conference center in Wembley stopping David White in the 2nd round ensuring that his debut year as a professional was an unbeaten one.

Throughout 2005 Barker fought on five more occasions winning each time and then kept busy in 2006 with another seven contests winning all of them.  One notable contest during that year took place on 15 September 2006 and was for the Southern Area Middleweight title with Barker beating Hussein Osman at the Alexandra Palace in Wood Green.  Other notable victories that year included wins over Danny Thornton in May and Paul Samuels in December. A successful start to his career was then violently curtailed when on 10 December 2006 Barker received the news that his brother Gary, also a boxer, had been killed in a car accident. Following the accident Darren decided to take a break from boxing eventually returning to the ring on 5 October 2007 with a win over Greg Barton at the York Hall.

Commonwealth champion
On 14 November 2007 Barker fought for his first major title, the vacant Commonwealth Middleweight belt.  His opponent, the undefeated Australian Ben Crampton had won 20 fights to date with only one draw.  Barker won the fight at the York Hall by unanimous decision over 12 rounds to lift the title. His first defence saw him beat former British & European title challenger Steve Bendall with a seventh round stoppage.  Barker then travelled to Canada in August 2008 and beat local man Larry Sharpe, a former Canadian champion and Commonwealth challenger, in a non-title fight over 10 rounds. On 13 December 2008, Barker defended his title for the second time against Northern Ireland's Jason McKay forcing him to retire at the end of round six.  Barker's third defence of the title took place on 23 May 2009 against Dudley's Darren McDermott in a fight which was also billed as a British title eliminator.  The fight which was held at the Watford Colosseum ended with a fourth round stoppage for the champion.

British champion
On 28 November 2009 Barker defeated Danny Butler, at the Brentwood Centre in Brentwood to lift the vacant British Middleweight title with the fight also doubling as a fourth defence of his Commonwealth crown. The original opponent for the fight Wayne Elcock, a former champion, had withdrawn due to a stomach virus meaning that Butler had come into the contest at short notice. Barker's class showed, and the referee called a stop to the fight in round 7 deciding that Butler, who had recently lost to Darren McDermott in a challenge for the English title, was in no position to continue.

European champion
On 9 April 2010 Barker claimed the European title with a unanimous points victory over Affif Belghecham of France.  The shot at the European belt was unexpected following the surprise vacating of the title by previous holder Matthew Macklin who had hopes of pursuing World title ambitions. The fight against Belghecham, the reigning French and EU champion, proved to be the toughest of his career so far with the Frenchman pushing Barker all the way. Barker, now the holder of three championship belts, decided to vacate the Commonwealth title and set his sights upon defending the British and European belts against Matthew Macklin, whose world title ambitions did not materialise, later in the year in an eagerly anticipated fight dubbed the 'Battle of Britain'.  The fight was to be one of the showcases of Frank Warrens 'Magnificent Seven' boxing event to be shown live on SKY PPV on 18 September 2010. The fight however had to be called off following the re-occurrence of a hip injury whilst sparring for the contest meaning that Barker had to pull out of the contest and relinquish the title.  Barkers trainer Tony Sims said of the decision to pull him out of the fight "Everyone knows he had a hip operation a few months back and the day before yesterday (31 August 2010) he broke down for a second time. A few weeks ago is when it first happened I gave him five days off, but it went again this week midway through when he was sparring Danny Cadman...He asked for a few more days off but how long do you keep doing that for?." Barker's would be opponent Matthew Macklin eventually won the now vacant title fight following a 6th round win over Georgia's late replacement Shalva Jomardashvili.

Two-time European champion
On 1 May 2011 Barker regained the now vacant European middleweight title with a points win over Italy's Domenico Spada at the Olympia in London after over 12 months away from the ring.  The Londoner was declared the winner after the judges scored the contest 115–113 and 116–113 after 12 rounds. Prior to the fight Barker spoke of his excitement at returning to the ring following his hip injury saying "I'm really excited about it and eager to show the general public what I'm made of" he added "training has gone well. [I've] been out for a year now, and I'm really looking forward to getting back in there." The fight also represented Barker's first outing with his new representatives Matchroom Sport after splitting from long time promoter Mick Hennessey, Barker described teaming up with Barry and Eddie Hearn at Matchroom as the "best thing to do" and said that he felt moving promoters would "benefit my career."

Middleweight world title attempt

On 1 October 2011 Barker fought Argentinian Sergio Martínez for the WBC Diamond Middleweight title at the Boardwalk Hall in Atlantic City.  Martinez, in his previous encounters, had worked his way up to third in the pound for pound world rankings with victories over the likes of Kelly Pavlik, Paul Williams and Sergiy Dzinziruk. The fight resulted in another successful defence for Martinez as Barker suffered a first career defeat with an 11th-round knockout.

Rebuilding
On 9 March 2013, Darren Barker began a comeback by facing off against Italy's Simone Rotolo (34-3, 15 KO's) for the vacant IBF Inter-Continental Middleweight Title in the Wembley Arena in London. Barker scored a first round knockdown and went on to win the title as Rotolo retired with an injured hand in the fourth round.

IBF middleweight champion
On 17 August 2013, Barker challenged Australian Daniel Geale for Geale's IBF Middleweight world title. Despite being knocked down by his Australian opponent in the sixth round by a vicious body shot Barker battled back and won his first world title taking a split decision victory.

First title defence
In early Autumn 2013, it was announced by Eddie Hearn that Barker's first defense of the IBF Middleweight Title would be against veteran German boxer Felix Sturm at the Porsche-Arena, Stuttgart, Germany on 7 December 2013. Felix Sturm dropped and felled Barker twice in the second round before his corner threw in the towel, Barker having dislocated his hip from the first knockdown. Following the fight, Barker spoke about retirement due to a recurring hip injury, for which he had received surgery a few years earlier, and eventually in 2014 he announced his retirement from boxing.

Professional boxing record

References

External links

English male boxers
People from Chipping Barnet
Commonwealth Games gold medallists for England
Boxers at the 2002 Commonwealth Games
1982 births
Living people
International Boxing Federation champions
World middleweight boxing champions
European Boxing Union champions
Commonwealth Boxing Council champions
Commonwealth Games medallists in boxing
Boxers from Greater London
British Boxing Board of Control champions
Medallists at the 2002 Commonwealth Games